The Reckoning is a 2020 adventure horror film directed by Neil Marshall, from a screenplay by Marshall, Charlotte Kirk and Edward Evers-Swindell. It stars Kirk, Joe Anderson, Steven Waddington and Sean Pertwee. The film follows a woman accused of being a witch after losing her husband to plague.

Filming took place in Budapest, Hungary. Both interior and exterior scenes were filmed at Fot Studios, Hungary on sets built and designed by Ian Bailie.

The film had its world premiere at the Fantasia International Film Festival on 20 August 2020 and was released to limited theaters and digital on 5 February 2021.

Plot
After losing her husband during the Great Plague, Grace Haverstock (Kirk) is unjustly accused of being a witch and placed in the custody of England's most ruthless witch-hunter, Judge Moorcroft (Pertwee). Forced to endure physical and emotional torture while steadfastly maintaining her innocence, Grace must face her own inner demons as the Devil himself starts to work his way into her mind.

Cast

Filming
While The Reckoning is set in Northern England in 1665, the film was shot entirely in Budapest, Hungary in 2019.

Release
The film had its world premiere at the Fantasia International Film Festival on 20 August 2020; its UK premiere at the London FrightFest Film Festival on 23 October 2020; and its US premiere at Beyond Fest in October 2020 as a physical event at a drive-in theatre. The film was released on Blu-ray and DVD in the USA by RLJE Films on 6 April 2021.

The film received negative reviews from critics. On Metacritic, the film received a score of 31 out of 100 based on 7 reviews, indicating "generally unfavorable reviews."

References

External links
 

2020 films
2020 adventure films
2020 horror thriller films
2020s monster movies
British adventure films
British horror thriller films
British monster movies
2020s English-language films
Films directed by Neil Marshall
Films set in the 1660s
Films set in England
British natural horror films
Adventure horror films
2020s British films
Films about witchcraft